Events in the year 1997 in Namibia.

Incumbents 

 President: Sam Nujoma
 Prime Minister: Hage Geingob
 Chief Justice of Namibia: Ismael Mahomed

Events 

 13 September – A German Air Force Tupolev Tu-154M observation aircraft and a United States Air Force C-141B Starlifter transport aircraft were destroyed in a mid-air collision off the coast of the country.

Deaths

References 

 
1990s in Namibia
Years of the 20th century in Namibia
Namibia
Namibia